Before the independence of Montenegro, football clubs from that country played in different competitions. From 1945 to 2006, Montenegrin club played in the leagues of SFR Yugoslavia, FR Yugoslavia and Federation of Serbia and Montenegro. 

Upon the independence referendum, Montenegrin Football Association established their own competitions, with the Montenegrin First League as a top tier.

History
As a part of the football system in SFR Yugoslavia, FR Yugoslavia and Serbia and Montenegro, Montenegrin clubs played in different leagues. Below is the table with chronology of competition system and leagues in which played Montenegrin teams during the each period from 1945 to 2006.

Montenegrin clubs in Yugoslav First League

Participants and seasons (1946-1992)
During the existence of SFR Yugoslavia, Montenegrin clubs which participated in the First League were FK Budućnost and FK Sutjeska. Budućnost was among the clubs which participated in the first season of Yugoslav First League (1946-47).

Participants and seasons (1992-2006)
Due to fact that in new state union of FR Yugoslavia (later Serbia and Montenegro) were two republics, Montenegrin clubs find easier way to qualify for the First League. Among the clubs which played one or more seasons in the First League of FR Yugoslavia and, later, Serbia and Montenegro, were FK Budućnost, FK Sutjeska, FK Rudar, FK Mogren, FK Zeta, FK Kom and FK Jedinstvo.

Republic League of Montenegro (3rd tier)

FR Yugoslavia Second League - South Region
 2000/01 - FK Rudar Pljevlja (3 other teams in higher division)
 2001/02 - FK Mogren (3 other teams in higher division)
 2002-03 - FK Kom (4 other teams in higher division)
 2003-04 - FK Budućnost (3 other teams in higher division)

Montenegrin First League
 2004-05 - FK Jedinstvo (3 other teams in higher division)
 2005-06 - FK Rudar Pljevlja (3 other teams in higher division)

Montenegrin First League
Association football in Montenegro lists